The University of Wisconsin-La Crosse (UWL or UW-La Crosse) is a public university in La Crosse, Wisconsin. Established in 1909, it is part of the University of Wisconsin System and offers bachelor's, master's, and doctoral degrees. With 9,600 undergraduate and 1,000 graduate students, UW-La Crosse is composed of four schools and colleges offering 102 undergraduate programs, 31 graduate programs, and 2 doctoral programs. UW-La Crosse has over 85,000 alumni across all 50 U.S. states and 57 countries.

The university is classified among "Master's Colleges & Universities: Larger Programs" and had research expenditures of $3 million in 2020. Nationally recognized programs include occupational therapy, physical therapy, and physician assistant offerings at the graduate level. UWL also offers a top ranked archaeology and anthropology undergraduate degree program, the only one in the Midwest and one of few nationally.

The UW-La Crosse Eagle's 21 athletic teams compete in the Wisconsin Intercollegiate Athletic Conference, in NCAA's Division III. The university mascot is Stryker the Eagle.

History

The early years 
The university was founded as the La Crosse State Normal School in 1909, the eighth of nine state normal schools established in Wisconsin between 1866 and 1916 for the purpose of teacher preparation. Thomas Morris sponsored the bill in the Wisconsin State Senate that led to the university's creation. Initially, the La Crosse State Normal School was authorized to offer two-year programs to prepare students for the teaching profession. Main Hall (now Maurice O. Graff Main Hall), the original building on campus, was constructed the year the school was founded. The La Crosse State Normal School opened its doors later that same year with Fassett A. Cotton as its first president.
La Crosse State Normal School students began organizing several extra-curricular activities within two years of the school's founding. In 1910, students published the first campus newspaper, The Racquet, which is still published today. The Physical Education Club was formed in 1912, making it the longest continuous organization in the school's history.
The Physical Education Building (now Wittich Hall), the original physical education building, was completed in 1916 after delays due to the start of World War I. This was not the only setback for the school during this period. The school struggled through serious declines in enrollment and funding following World War I and throughout the Great Depression.

In 1926, George M. Snodgrass became the school's third president, replacing Ernest A. Smith, who served for only one year. That same year the school's programs were expanded and authorization was given to award baccalaureate teaching degrees. This led to an institutional name change the following year to La Crosse State Teachers College.

In 1931, the college was divided into separate elementary education, secondary education, and physical education divisions. It was also this year that the homecoming tradition of the "Hanging of the Lantern" began at the south entrance of Maurice O. Graff Main Hall. It was created by English teacher Orris O. White who remarked, "We'll hang the lantern in the old college tower... You won't need to look for the key – the door will be open."
The Training School, which had also been referred to as the Campus School and the Model School, moved into its newly constructed building in 1939. The La Crosse State Teachers College Training School Building was later renamed Morris Hall in honor of Wisconsin politician, Thomas Morris. The Training School provided practice and supervised observation for teacher training candidates. 1973 was the last year of operation for the Training School. Rexford S. Mitchell became the college's fourth president that same year, serving until 1966.

Post World War II years 
After the Regents authorized the nine Wisconsin State Teachers Colleges to establish baccalaureate degrees in liberal arts, the college changed its name to Wisconsin State College-La Crosse in 1951. It was also this same year that Wilder Hall became the first campus residence hall. In 1956, the college was authorized to establish graduate programs, which led to the Master of Science and Master of Arts in Teaching degrees. A graduate program in physical education was also established at that time. Florence Wing Library, the college's first library, was constructed that same year and began a period of substantial expansion for the college. Over the next 18 years (1956–1974), the college ballooned from 5 buildings to a total of 23 buildings. The college added 11 residence halls, 4 academic buildings, 2 libraries, and 2 student centers during that time.

In 1959, the college celebrated its 50th anniversary, with an enrollment of 1,821 students. That same year presidential candidate John F. Kennedy visited campus and spoke to a packed Graff Main Hall auditorium.

In 1964, the college was designated a university as part of the Wisconsin State University System and was renamed Wisconsin State University-La Crosse. This designation led to the creation of the Colleges of Education, Health-Recreation-Physical Education, and Letters and Sciences. Later, the School of Business Administration was also formed within College of Letters and Sciences. A few years after receiving university designation, the university's fifth president, Samuel G. Gates, began his term in 1966.

The Wisconsin State University System merged with the University of Wisconsin System in 1971, at which time the university adopted its current name and also changed the title for the head of the university from President to Chancellor. Kenneth E. Lindner, who was at the time the university's sixth president, became the university's first chancellor. Lindner, after serving as chancellor from 1971 to 1979, was succeeded by Noel Richards, who served as the university's chancellor until 1991. Lindner Forest, a heavily wooded section in the southern part of campus, was named in honor of former Chancellor Lindner.

In 1989, the university's mascot became the Eagle. UWL men's athletics teams had previously been known as the Indians (1937–1989), Red Raiders, Hurricanes, Racqueteers, and Peds and Maroons. The women's athletic teams were known as the Roonies, derived from the university's school colors of maroon and gray, since the inception of female intercollegiate competition in the early 1970s. They adopted the Eagle mascot a year after it became the university mascot. Since the adoption of the Eagle mascot, the band's mascot has been the Screaming Eagle, having been known as the Marching Chiefs before that. The "Eagle in the L" and caricature, which were both created in 1989, were unveiled just before the fall sports teams took to the field as the Eagles for the first time. They were penned by Dave Christianson, a 1973 arts graduate who created the images after the adoption of the Eagle mascot.

The 1990s 
In 1991, Judith Kuipers became UWL's third chancellor, serving until 2000. She was the institution's first and only woman leader. In 1992, Kuipers was instrumental in the creation of the La Crosse Medical Health Science Consortium. The consortium, a collaboration of UWL, Viterbo University, Western Technical College, Franciscan Skemp Medical Center, and Gundersen Lutheran Medical Center, was created to provide cutting-edge medical education, research and training. This led to the creation of the US $27 million Health Science Center in 2000.

Under the university's strategic plan, "Forward Together," the university reorganized into four colleges: the College of Business Administration; the College of Health, Physical Education, and Recreation; the College of Science and Allied Health; and the College of Liberal Studies, which housed the School of Arts and Communication and the School of Education. The College of Health, Physical Education, and Recreation underwent a few names changes before eventually merging with the College of Science and Allied Health to form the College of Science and Health in 2006.

The Cleary Alumni & Friends Center along with Murphy Library remodeling projects were completed in 1995. Construction continued on campus, and two years later, the Recreational Eagle Center and the Hoeschler clock tower were also finished. Hoeschler Tower becomes a focal point on campus and the new home for the traditional "Hanging of the Lantern."

The 21st century 
The turn of the century saw a number of changes at UWL. The Archaeology Building and Laboratories, which was a US $380,000 renovation of the campus's original power plant, had its grand opening that year. A US $9.9 million renovation to Wing Technology Center also was started at that time and was completed in 2001. Another major change was the resignation of Chancellor Kuipers. She was replaced on an interim basis by Douglas Hastad, who was named the university's fourth chancellor and ninth leader by the UW System Board of Regents in 2001.

In the 2001–2002 academic year, the university's athletic teams won four national championships, three NCAA Division III championships (indoor track and field, outdoor track and field, and cross country), and one NCGA title (women's gymnastics).

Joe Gow became the fifth chancellor and 10th leader of UW-La Crosse on February 1, 2007. He replaced Douglas Hastad, who left to become president at Carroll College, in Waukesha, Wisconsin. His official inauguration took place on October 19, 2007. Gow often personally e-mails the entire student body to inform them about student accomplishments and upcoming university events. An accomplished guitarist, he performed at the Cartwright Center's "Cellar" restaurant for students after taking over as chancellor.

The university supports cultural events, regional and national conferences, prominent speakers, applied research, health care, professionals with varying expertise, a large workforce, and numerous faculty, staff and student community volunteers.

The percentage of the university's budget that is state funded has declined over the past few years. In 1996, students paid 35% of the cost of their education at UWL and the state the remaining 65%. By 2005, the student share had grown to 51% as the state's shrunk to 49%. The university has felt the strain caused by decreased public funding. The university's centennial campaign and "growth and access" agenda are both aimed at providing the necessary financial resources to deal with the decreased state funding.

The university's plans for the future revolve around increasing access to UWL for talented students of all backgrounds and expanding student research and academic opportunities. Both the centennial campaign and "growth and access" agenda are major tools meant to lead the university to these goals.

Construction for a new academic building, Centennial Hall, began Spring 2009 and the building opened for the Fall 2011 academic year. Built at a cost of $44 million, it houses 44 classrooms, two auditoriums, the Academic Advising Center, Counseling and Testing Center, Multicultural Student Services, Office of International Education, and Student Support Services.

Students in the spring of 2012 overwhelming voted in favor of a new student center to replace the Cartwright Student Center. Construction for the new student center occurred during the 2014–2015 and 2015–2016 academic years, and the Student Union opened in January 2017. The new student center edifice was designed to emulate Grandad Bluff, a defining feature of La Crosse. It houses 7 distinct eateries, a game room, movie theater, live performance space, The Cove (a central hub for university organizations), the Pride Center, Veterans' Lounge, campus food pantry, a wide array of relaxation and study saccommodate ces, and meeting rooms that can accommodate conferences and other events.

Campus 

The  campus is located in a residential section of La Crosse. The extensive landscape of grassy fields, trees, flowers, and other vegetation gives the campus a distinct park-like feel. The university has limited vehicle traffic on campus. In 2006, UW-La Crosse received a "Grand Award" at the 2006 Green Star Awards competition for its campus landscaping from the Professional Grounds Management Society.

To the east of campus are the La Crosse bluffs, of which the most prominent is Grandad Bluff (mentioned in Life on the Mississippi by Mark Twain. Downtown La Crosse and the Mississippi River are about a half mile west of campus.

Hoeschler Tower (1996), located in the heart of UWL, is the focal point of campus and a popular destination and meeting place for students. It is also the site for many university and student events, such as concerts, fundraisers, the clocktower dance, memorial services, and the traditional hanging of the lantern.

Students can live in one of the university's residence halls. The newest residence hall, Eagle Hall, opened Fall 2011 and houses 500 students and the Office of Residence Life. Reuter Hall, an apartment-style residence hall, was completed in 2006. Two 1950s-era residence halls, Trowbridge Hall and Baird Hall, were demolished in spring 2009 to make way for a new academic building, Centennial Hall, which was completed in the fall of 2011 and is the largest academic building on campus.

In 2018, Badger Street was converted into the Badger Street Mall, a pedestrian corridor between the Student Union and Prairie Springs Science Center. The mall features new pedestrian walkways, including landscaping, lighting, storm water management features, bicycle racks, and seating. Plans to expand the mall further west past Murphy Library to the Whitney Center will be completed in summer 2020.

Notable and historic buildings

Maurice O. Graff Main Hall 
Graff Main Hall is the oldest building on campus built in 1909 and contains the chancellor's office, a 787-seat auditorium, classrooms, the departments of Philosophy, Psychology and Modern Languages, and other administrative and student services offices. It was designated a historic site by the city of La Crosse, Wisconsin in 1984 and is on the National Register of Historic Places as the Main Hall/La Crosse State Normal School.

Wittich Hall 
Built in 1916, the original physical education building housed faculty and staff offices, gymnasiums, a track, multipurpose and meeting rooms, a strength training center, a therapeutic/rehabilitation swimming pool, the Musculoskeletal Research Center, and the Special Populations Exercise Program. The building has been renovated for use in the preparation of special/adapted physical education teachers and therapeutic recreation specialists. Administrative, faculty, staff, and graduate assistant offices for the Department of Recreation Management and Therapeutic Recreation are located in Wittich Hall. The building is also the primary practice site for the Women's Intercollegiate Athletics Gymnastics team. Wittich Hall, the Physical Education Building of the La Crosse State Normal School, was listed in the National Register of Historic Places in 1985 as the Physical Education Building/La Crosse State Normal School.  In Fall 2020, Wittich Hall was re-opened as the home of the College of Business Administration.

Thomas Morris Hall 
Morris Hall (1939, 1966, remodeled 1996) first opened in January 1940 as the La Crosse State Teachers College Training School Building. Today, Morris Hall houses the instructional and administrative facilities for the School of Education, including the Department of Educational Studies, the Master of Education-Professional Development Program (ME-PD), the Learning Communities Programs, the Office of Student Teaching and Internships, the Office of Continuing Education and Extension, and the Frederick Theater. Morris Hall is on the National Register of Historic Places.

Eugene W. Murphy Library 
Murphy Library (1969, remodeled 1995), is centrally located on campus. It was named for Eugene W. Murphy in recognition of his 22 years of service to UWL and the University of Wisconsin System Board of Regents. At the time of its construction, the library cost US $2.5 million to construct. , Murphy Library had a total of 691,282 books, bound periodicals, and government documents. The library also offers electronic resources, such as journals and databases. In 2006, the library opened Murphy's Mug Café, which is managed by the campus dining services.

Truman T. Lowe Center for the Arts 
Built in 1973, the Center for the Arts was named for UWL alumnus and Ho-Chunk artist Truman T. Lowe in 2022. The Lowe Center for the Arts serves as UWL's hub for creative activity, housing the Departments of Art, Music, and Theatre and Dance. As such, the building is home to the University Gallery, Annette Recital Hall, and Toland Theatre. The University Gallery hosts exhibits by students, faculty, and professional guests. Many of UWL's music ensembles, faculty, students, and professional musicians regularly perform in the Annette Recital Hall. The Toland Theatre is the site of five of the Department of Theatre and Dance's seven annual full-scale theatrical productions. Additional facilities include 20 practice rooms, rehearsal halls, a second student gallery space, ceramics studio, digital art studio, metals studio, painting studio, drawing studio, sculpture studio, music listening lab, sound design and mixing lab, offices, scenic shop, and costume shop and storage.

Health Science Center 
Built in 2000, the $27 million Health Science Center was a project of the La Crosse Medical Health Science Consortium. The building includes laboratory facilities for the medical laboratory science, nuclear medicine technology, occupational and physical therapy, physician assistant, and radiation therapy programs. Biology and microbiology research laboratories are also available for medical research. Laboratories and classrooms, including distance education classrooms, are shared by all educational programs at the center. A student health center, including a physical therapy clinic, is located on the main floor and serves UWL and neighboring Western Technical College students.

Cleary Alumni and Friends Center 
The Cleary Alumni and Friends Center was built in 1995 by the University of Wisconsin–La Crosse Foundation and donated to the university. Members of both the university and the greater La Crosse community meet and take advantage of the conference center, smaller conference rooms, and large banquet hall. The Cleary Center houses the University of Wisconsin–La Crosse Foundation offices and the Alumni and University Relations advancement offices.

Centennial Hall 
Built in 2011, Centennial Hall was the first academic building to be open on campus since 1974. It is located in the center of campus and holds 46 classrooms, including two 250-seat auditoriums, various academic and student advising departments, and a Starbucks coffee outlet. A large, open entryway in the building opens up to the Hall of Nations. The room houses flags from 44 countries, representing the diversity of UWL's international students. Centennial Hall also houses a counseling and testing center and offices for communications, environmental studies, philosophy, and women's and gender studies.

Considered LEED gold certified, Centennial Hall features a solar roof providing heated water for the entire building. The building's U-shape design also provides 90% of the building natural light.

W. Carl Wimberly Hall 
Completed in 1974 and originally called "North Hall", in 2000 this building was named for former professor and Dean of the College of Arts, Letters and Sciences, W. Carl Wimberly. The building has classrooms, three auditoriums, and the offices of the College of Business Administration, the accounting, archeology, sociology, economics, English, ethnic and racial studies, finance, history, management, marketing, political science and public administration departments, and the Small Business Development Center.

Prairie Springs Science Center
The newest academic building on campus, the Prairie Springs Science Center was completed in 2018 at a cost of $84 million. The 189,000 square foot building contains 36 instructional labs and 23 research labs that support the university's biology, biochemistry, chemistry, earth science, geography, microbiology, and physics programs. A $2 million endowment, the largest single gift in UW-L history, was donated by Carolyn and Jay Scott in support of the new science building.

Recreational facilities

The U 
Completed in January 2017, UWL's new student union is three stories and just over 204,000 square feet. It includes offices for the Student Association, Student Senate, Pride Center, and the COVE, which encompasses all student organizations. It also houses an auditorium on the second floor, the University Bookstore, Textbook Rental Services, meeting rooms, a cafeteria, a theater, and a game room.

Cartwright Center 
Cartwright Hall (1959 with additions in 1965 and 1985), is the former student union. It was home to the University Bookstore, Textbook Rental Services, TV and reading lounges, a computer lab, student organization offices and resources, the Involvement Center, Pride Center, and meeting rooms. Currently, it houses offices for instructors and space for gymnastics practice.

Mitchell Hall 
Mitchell Hall (1965) is a recreational, teaching, research, and service facility located adjacent to outdoor practice fields, soccer fields, and Veterans Memorial Stadium. Facilities include a swimming pool, basketball courts, wrestling room, dance studio, racquetball courts, and a  strength and conditioning center. The field house located in Mitchell Hall has a 4-lane 200-meter polyurethane track, long and triple jump pit, pole vault boxes, nets for tennis, badminton, volleyball, golf, softball/baseball hitting, and a climbing wall.

Recreational Eagle Center 
The Recreational Eagle Center ("The Rec"), built in 1997, houses Intramural and Student Recreational Sports. The building includes a field house, a 200-meter elevated running track with warm-up areas, a strength and conditioning center, a climbing gym, a child care center, TV lounges, locker rooms/shower rooms, and various multi-purpose activity rooms. The Rec Eagle Center regularly hosts campus activities, such as Rectoberfest and the 5K Turkey Trot Run/Walk. Attached to the Rec Eagle Center is a child care center that serves the children of students and faculty.

On July 2, 2015, then President Barack Obama spoke to a crowd of 2,400 at The Rec. President Obama was joined by Wisconsin U.S. Senator Tammy Baldwin, U.S. Representative Ron Kind, and other local leaders.

Opened on October 1, 2018, a two-level 35,000 square foot expansion included an enlarged strength training space, multipurpose recreation room, and other related support spaces. A solar roof on top of the building was included in the project and provides electricity for a significant portion of the building's energy usage.

Student demographics 
As of the fall 2017 semester, there are 9,861 undergraduate students, 818 graduate students, and international students representing 31 countries enrolled at UW-La Crosse. 80% of students come from Wisconsin and 20% represent 41 states across the nation.

Incoming freshman average an ACT score of 25 and a median high school class rank in the 80th percentile, the second highest academic profile in the UW System. In fall 2017, 67 high school valedictorians were represented in the incoming freshman class. UW-La Crosse also bolsters an 86% retention rate of freshman returning to UWL their next year, the second highest in the UW System after UW-Madison.

Academics 
UW–La Crosse offers 90 undergraduate programs in 44 disciplines, and 26 graduate programs and emphases in eight disciplines. Microbiology and exercise and sport science are designated as UW System Centers of Excellence, and the College of Business Administration holds international accreditation. UW-La Crosse also offers Wisconsin's only nationally accredited degrees in recreation management and therapeutic recreation, the UW System's only nuclear medicine technology program, and offers one of two Midwest undergraduate archaeology majors.

Colleges and schools 
The university is organized into three colleges and a school: the College of Business Administration; the College of Science and Health; the College of Arts, Social Sciences, & Humanities; and a School of Education.

College of Business Administration 
The College of Business Administration (CBA) is professionally accredited by AACSB International (The Association to Advance Collegiate Schools of Business). It provides undergraduate programs, along with a consortial graduate program in business administration.

College of Arts, Social Sciences, and Humanities 
There are a wide variety of undergraduate and two graduate degree programs that comprise the College of Arts, Social Sciences, and Humanities (CASSH). Departments include:

 Archeology and Anthropology
 Art
 Communication Studies
 English
 Global Cultures and Languages
 History
 Military Science/ROTC
 Music
 Philosophy
 Political Science and Public Administration
 Psychology
 Race, Gender, and Sexuality Studies
 Sociology and Criminal Justice
 Student Affairs Administration
 Theatre and Dance

College of Science and Health 
The College of Science and Health (CSH) accounts for just over half of UWL's total enrollment. The 11 departments of the college   offer 47 undergraduate and 14 graduate degree programs. In addition to a degree 14 pre-professional programs are offered. The Athletic Training, Chemistry, Clinical Laboratory Science, Medical Dosimetry, Nuclear Medicine Technology, Occupational Therapy, Physical Therapy, Physician Assistant, Radiation Therapy, Recreation Management, Public Health and Therapeutic Recreation programs are all fully accredited.

The college also offers a Doctor of Physical Therapy (DPT) degree which was ranked #39 in the nation by U.S. News & World Report. The doctoral offering is a 34-month program with roughly 45 students.

School of Education

The School of Education contains teacher education programs housed in a variety of departments and colleges across the university. Teacher education programs are reviewed by the Wisconsin Department of Instruction (DPI).

Interdisciplinary and community partnership centers 
Interdisciplinary and community partnership centers at the university include:
 Center on Disability Health & Adapted Physical Education
 Center for Grief & Death Education
 Institute for Latina/o and Latin American Studies
 Institute for Social Justice
 La Crosse Exercise and Health Program
 La Crosse Institute for Movement Science
 La Crosse Medical Health Science Consortium
 Mississippi Valley Archaeology Center
 River Studies Center
 Small Business Development Center
 Tourism Research Institute

Engineering dual degree partnerships 
UW–La Crosse partners with the University of Wisconsin–Madison, the University of Wisconsin-Milwaukee, the University of Wisconsin-Platteville, and the University of Minnesota Twin Cities in a program that allows students to complete three years of study at UWL before transferring to the partnership university for two years to complete the science or engineering portion of a dual degree.

Rankings and recognition 

In 2022, U.S. News & World Report ranked UWL #124 among public "national universities" and number two in Wisconsin behind UW-Madison and ahead of UW-Milwaukee. Within the same report UWL ranked #250 across all national universities, public or private. In 2014 Kiplinger's Personal Finance, ranked the university fourth on its list of the "25 Best College Values Under $30,000 a Year".

Student life 
UW-La Crosse offers over 175 different student organizations in a wide range of areas, including academic, religious, cultural, athletic, political, social, and other organizations. Intramural sports programs are also available to students. The Physical Education Club, which was formed in 1912, is the longest continuously operating organization at the school.

Greek life plays a small role at UWL. Only about 1% of men and 1% of women in the student body are members of a social fraternity or sorority. The six social fraternities represented on campus are Delta Sigma Phi, Sigma Tau Gamma, Sigma Alpha Epsilon, Chi Phi, Lambda Chi Alpha, and Kappa Sigma; while the three sororities represented are Alpha Xi Delta, Tri Sigma, and Alpha Phi. Delta Sigma Phi is the only Greek organization on campus with a fraternity house. The Eta Rho chapter of the Delta Sigma Pi professional business fraternity is a coed option for students of the College of Business Administration.

Media 

The Racquet Press is UWL's student news source. The paper, which began in 1910, contains student-produced articles about campus, community, state, and national events. The Racquet Press is composed of five major sections: news, sports, letters to the editor, photo series, and humans of UWL. The majority of The Racquet Press''' budget is contributed via student fees or from advertising. In 2013, The Racquet Press was ranked #32 in the nation and #1 in Wisconsin in the Top 100 College Newspapers for Journalism Students.The Second Supper was a satirical newspaper that was published by students.The Catalyst is a student-produced and edited publication of student-submitted collection of original essays, short stories, and poetry. Each edition has a different theme. The Catalyst intends to provide a channel for creative intellectual inquiry in order to provoke campus and community discussion.

 Traditions 

 The Eagle mascot 
The university's school colors are maroon and gray. The university mascot, which was adopted in 1989, is the Eagle. UWL men's athletics teams had previously been known as the Indians (1937–1989), Red Raiders, Hurricanes, Racqueteers, and Peds and Maroons. The women's athletic teams were known as the Roonies, derived from the university's school colors of maroon and gray, since the inception of female intercollegiate competition in the early 1970s until November 1990 when they also adopted the Eagle mascot. Since the adoption of the Eagle mascot, the band's mascot has been the Screaming Eagle, having previously been known as the Marching Chiefs.

UW-La Crosse's athletic teams sport an "Eagle in the L" and caricature, which was created in 1989, when the sports teams took to the field as the Eagles for the first time. It was created by Dave Christianson, a 1973 art major graduate who penned the images after the UWL men's teams adopted the Eagle mascot. Women's teams started sporting the Eagles moniker in November 1990. The UWL Eagle mascot was named "Colbert" in a vote by students during the 2008–2009 school year. On October 10, 2012, Colbert was retired, and a new similar looking mascot was introduced, named Stryker.  

 Hanging of the Lantern 
The Hanging of the Lantern tradition dates back to 1913 when UWL students hung small lanterns in house windows near campus. In 1931, longtime faculty member Orris O. White began a tradition of hanging one large lantern in the Maurice O. Graff Main Hall tower, above the building's south entrance. The act welcomed alumni who had returned home. "We'll hang the lantern in the old college tower over the south door. You won't need to look for the key—the door will be open," declared White.

Since 1931, a lantern has hung each Homecoming. It hung on the south side of Graff Main Hall until 1997 when it was moved to the Hoeschler Tower in the center of campus. The tower's lantern hangs year-round and is lit every evening at dusk.

 Lighting of the "L" 
The Lighting of the "L" tradition began after a 1935 college prank. Bored on a foggy day, F. Clark Carnes and Bernie Brown hiked up Miller's Bluff, north of Grandad Bluff. When Brown and Carnes reached Veterans Memorial Stadium, the fog lifted and allowed the crowd to see the "L". In recent years, the "L" has been lit by electricity and shines from Grandad Bluff.

Athletics

The University of Wisconsin–La Crosse maintains programs in several sports including indoor and outdoor track, cross country, gymnastics, and football, competing in the Wisconsin Intercollegiate Athletic Conference (WIAC), which is in the NCAA's Division III. UWL holds membership affiliation in the National Collegiate Athletic Association (NCAA), The Association of Intercollegiate Athletics for Women (AIAW), The National Association of Intercollegiate Athletics, and the National Collegiate Gymnastics Association (NCGA).

UWL has student athletes participating on 19 teams, won 72 national titles in the following categories:

UWL has also won 391 Wisconsin Intercollegiate Athletic Conference championships. UWL is one of only six institutions in NCAA Division III history to finish in the top 20 all 10 years of the Directors' Cup, which includes all 433 NCAA Division III schools. UWL has won WIAC Conference Championships in the following categories:

UWL has won 27 men's track and field titles, the most in Division III history. The Eagles have won 14 indoor and 10 outdoor championships, both ranking first in the nation. The Eagles have now swept the indoor and outdoor titles in the same season 10 times (1988, 1991–1993, 1997, 2001–2004 and, 2006).

The university won the NCAA Division III "triple crown" in 2001–2002, claiming the men's cross country title, men's indoor track and field title and men's outdoor track & field championship. The university is one of two NCAA Division III institutions to win the "triple crown" (the other being North Central College during 2009–2010). The Eagles also captured the 2005 NCAA Division III cross country title, the third in school history (1996, 2001).

The gymnastics team has won 12 national titles, a record in the NCGA, as well as a record 20 WIAC titles. UWL won its sixth consecutive National Collegiate Gymnastics Association (NCGA) Championship in 2006.

The Eagles won seven Wisconsin Intercollegiate Athletic Conference (WIAC) titles in 2005–2006 and finished in the top four in 16 of 18 sports. UWL also had nine WIAC Scholar Athletes last year and eight WIAC Coach of the Year honors. The Eagles had 203 All-WIAC honors in 2005–2006.

The UWL football team plays its home games at Veterans Memorial Stadium. In 2009 The football stadium and outdoor track was replaced by a new timed outdoor track, a football turf field, a new 10,000+ seat stadium/press box/field lights, plus surrounding soccer/athletic fields.

The university also has sports represented at the club level, including men's and women's lacrosse, men's and women's rugby union, men's soccer, baseball and many others.

Notable coaches
 Roger Harring, football coach
 Clyde B. Smith  football coach
 Clark Van Galder, football and basketball coach
 Bill Vickroy, football coach

Notable alumni

 Jerry Augustine, MLB player
 Mark Belling, talk show host
 Will Berzinski, NFL player
Ben Braun, college basketball coach
 Sharon Weston Broome, Louisiana legislator, mayor-president of Baton Rouge & East Baton Rouge Parish
Roman Brumm, NFL player
Gerald W. Clusen, U.S. Navy admiral
George Dahlgren, NFL player (did not graduate)
 Dan Davies, actor and screenwriter
 Mike Dee, college baseball coach at University of Illinois at Chicago
 Mabel Deutrich, assistant archivist for the Office of the National Archive (now NARA)
Steve Doyle, member of the Wisconsin State Assembly, La Crosse County Board of Supervisors
 Ernest Emerson, knife maker, martial artist, and CEO of Emerson Knives
 John Gard, 1986, former Speaker of the Wisconsin State Assembly
 Rob Greenfield, environmental activist
 Brian Gutekunst, NFL General Manager, Green Bay Packers
 Rodney R. Hannula, U.S. National Guard major general
 Thomas S. Hanson, Wisconsin State Assemblyman
 Don Herbert, host of the Mr. Wizard television show
 Edmund Hitt, Wisconsin State Assemblyman
G. Erle Ingram, Wisconsin State Senator
Don Iverson, 1968, professional golfer on the PGA Tour
Gaetano Kagwa, 1997, Uganda media personality
Dan Kapanke, former member of the Wisconsin State Senate
Don Kindt, 1980, NFL player
 Don Kindt, Jr., NFL player
 Tom Klawitter, MLB player
 Craig Kusick, 1972, baseball player
 Craig Kusick, Jr., Arena Football League quarterback
 Sandra Lee, 1987, host of The Food Network's Semi-Homemade with Sandra Lee and author
 MaryAnn Lippert, Wisconsin legislator and educator
 Ace Loomis, 1950, NFL playerUW-La Crosse Alumnus/Summer 2004 "
 Cindy Marten, 1988, United States Deputy Secretary of Education
 Mike Maslowski, National Football League (NFL) linebacker
 Ric Mathias, 1997 NFL player
 Greg Mattison, 1970, NCAA and NFL football coach
 John L. Merkt, 1971, Wisconsin legislator
Lewis T. Mittness, member of the Wisconsin State Assembly
Leland E. Mulder, member of the Wisconsin State Assembly
Neal Nelson, Hall of Fame basketball coach
 Tom Newberry, 1986, NFL offensive Lineman
 Kirsten Olson, 2014, former figure skater and actor in the Disney film Ice Princess''
 James D. H. Peterson, member of the Wisconsin State Assembly
 Robert Quackenbush, 1950, Wisconsin politician
 Dick Ritger, professional ten-pin bowler, PBA and USBC Hall of Fame member
 Andrew Rock, 2004 Olympic Gold Medalist in track and field
 Vinny Rottino, MLB player
 Marlin Schneider, 1965, member of the Wisconsin State Assembly
 Bill Schroeder, 1994, NFL wide receiver
 Webb Schultz, MLB player
 Robert Schulz, jazz cornet player
Ed Servais, 1981, college baseball coach at Saint Mary's and Creighton
 Richard Severson, 1971, U.S. Air Force general
 Jennifer Shilling, 1992, member of the Wisconsin State Senate
 F. Richard Spencer, Roman Catholic bishop
 William H. Stevenson, 1912, U.S. Congressman
 Ellen Tronnier, 1944, All-American Girls Professional Baseball League player
 Gregg Underheim, former member of the Wisconsin State Assembly
 Jeremy Unertl, 2001, Arena Football League player
Yia Vang, 2010, Hmong-American chef
 Joel Williams, 1978, NFL linebacker

See also 
 Viterbo University
 Western Technical College

References

External links 

UW-La Crosse Athletics website

 
University of Wisconsin-La Crosse
Educational institutions established in 1909
La Crosse
University of Wisconsin-La Crosse
Buildings and structures in La Crosse, Wisconsin
Education in La Crosse County, Wisconsin
Tourist attractions in La Crosse County, Wisconsin
1909 establishments in Wisconsin